Benjamin Lafayette Sisko is a fictional character in the Star Trek franchise portrayed by Avery Brooks. He was the main character of the television series Star Trek: Deep Space Nine (DS9), which was originally broadcast between 1993 and 1999. The character has also appeared in various books, comics, and video games of the Star Trek franchise.

Character history

Early life and career
Born in 2332 in New Orleans, Louisiana, Benjamin is the son of Joseph Sisko, chef and owner of the restaurant "Sisko's Creole Kitchen", or "Sisko's" for short. His birth mother was a human woman named Sarah. However, Sarah was possessed by one of the Bajoran Prophets (the entities that exist inside the Bajoran wormhole), and manipulated into marrying Joseph in order to conceive Benjamin. Sarah and Joseph were happily married until Sarah disappeared two days after Ben's first birthday, when the life-form left her body. She died in an accident several years later. Joseph eventually met and married another woman, who went on to raise Benjamin as her own son. Benjamin remained unaware of these events until well into his adulthood and long after he had otherwise made contact with the Bajoran Prophets. Ben has a sister named Judith, and at least two brothers.

Sisko entered Starfleet Academy in 2350. During his sophomore year, he was in a field-study assignment on Starbase 137. He met a woman named Jennifer in Babylon, New York, on Gilgo Beach, shortly after graduating from the Academy. The two eventually wed and had a son named Jake.

As a Starfleet officer coming up through the ranks, Sisko was mentored by Curzon Dax, a joined Trill serving as United Federation of Planets ambassador to the Klingon Empire, when the two were stationed aboard the USS Livingston early in Sisko's career. The symbiotic nature of the joined Trill becomes a significant aspect to Sisko's later relationships with his science officer Jadzia Dax and counselor Ezri Dax.

Sisko served aboard the USS Okinawa under Captain Leyton, who saw command potential in the young officer; Leyton promoted Sisko to Lieutenant Commander and made him his executive officer. It was during this assignment that Sisko and Leyton fought in the war between the Federation and the Tzenkethi.

Sisko eventually transferred to the USS Saratoga as its first officer. In early 2367, the Saratoga was one of the 40 Starfleet vessels involved in the Battle of Wolf 359 against the Borg.

In an attempt to gain knowledge about Starfleet defenses, the Borg assimilated Captain Jean-Luc Picard of the U.S.S. Enterprise, creating a Borg drone known as Locutus. In the ensuing battle, of the forty Federation starships amassed at Wolf 359 only the USS Endeavour (NCC-71805) survived. An estimated 11,000 people were lost, including Sisko's wife, Jennifer.

Afterward, Sisko took a position at the Utopia Planitia Fleet Yards on Mars. There he oversaw the development of new ships intended to contend with the Borg threat. One such ship, the USS Defiant, was later used against the Dominion.

Sisko was promoted to Captain on stardate 48959 during the episode "The Adversary".

Deep Space Nine
Sisko is a lead character and the commanding officer of the fictional space station, Deep Space Nine. In 2369, Sisko is assigned to the Bajoran sector to command Deep Space Nine and help Bajor's recovery from the recently concluded Cardassian occupation, shepherding them toward possible membership in the Federation. Sisko and his son Jake reluctantly take up residence on the station. Recognizing that the assignment on DS9 is not an "ideal environment" in which to raise a son, Sisko contemplates resigning his commission. Adding to Sisko's discomfort is the presence of Captain Picard, who briefs him on his mission. Sisko continues to harbor deep resentment toward Picard for his role, however unwilling, in the death of his wife.

Upon Sisko's first visit to Bajor, the Kai (Bajor's spiritual leader), Opaka Sulan, labels him "the Emissary of the Prophets" and gives him one of the Bajoran Orbs, that supposedly comes from Bajor's Prophets. By studying the orb and nearby stellar phenomenon, Jadzia Dax finds a location of unusual activity in the nearby Denorios Belt. Traveling there, Dax and Sisko discover the first known stable wormhole; the other end of which connects to the Gamma Quadrant. During their return trip through the wormhole, Sisko and Dax encounter the mysterious entities living within it. The devoutly spiritual Bajorans believe the wormhole to be the "Celestial Temple" and the entities to be the Prophets, respectively. These entities exist outside linear time. Sisko's first contact with the entities is awkward and difficult for both parties; but the encounter helps Sisko recognize that he has never allowed himself to move beyond the bitterness and grief of losing his wife, as well as his anger towards Picard. After leaving the wormhole, Sisko embraces the opportunity to move forward and command Deep Space Nine and adopts a less hostile attitude towards Picard before his departure.

After the station is moved to the mouth of the wormhole to firmly claim it for Bajor, it becomes a new hub of scientific, commercial and political activity. Sisko at first clashes with Major Kira Nerys and on more than one occasion has to rein her in by asserting his authority. However, as time passed, the two came to have great respect for and trust in each other. Their relationship reached a new level of personal comfort when Sisko was injured during a battle with the Dominion and Kira did her best to care for him; telling him a story and praying to the Prophets in process. During this, she realized that Sisko had kept her at a certain professional distance because of his role as the Emissary but this softened after this event.

Sisko's assignment to the station also saw him reunited with an old friend in a new form. Jadzia, a female Trill and the current host to Dax had been assigned as the science officer to Deep Space Nine. The Dax symbiont had previously been joined to Curzon Dax; a Federation Diplomat who had been an old friend and mentor to Sisko early in his career. Indeed, Sisko would call Jadzia "old man", the same nickname he had used with Curzon. Sisko, would, at times, seek Dax's advice and she would also ask his at times. Most especially when the symbiont belonging to one of Dax's previous hosts wives arrived in a new host and Dax felt conflicted. When the Dax Symbiont was passed on to a new host due to the death of Jadzia, Sisko acted as  something of a mentor to the new host, Ezri Dax.

Ezri was a young and inexperienced officer that had been joined to Dax when the symbiont's health seriously declined en route to the Trill home planet and a new host was required to save it. Ezri had not been prepared to be joined and had never wanted to be, so joining with Dax was rough for her. Sisko met Ezri for the first time while he was still on extended personal leave on Earth and Ezri subsequently assisted the Sisko family in their search for a new Bajoran orb. Upon meeting Ezri, Sisko promised to help her through the transition of being joined as well as helping her come to terms with the reality of her situation and Sisko found comfort in having his friend back, if even indirectly. After these events, Sisko returned to duty and arranged for Ezri's transfer to the station and posting as the station's counselor.

The wormhole's discovery cements in Opaka's and other Bajorans' minds the notion that Sisko is the Emissary of the Prophets, a title and set of responsibilities which initially makes Sisko uneasy, forcing him to walk a fine line in avoiding any violation of the Prime Directive. However, Sisko warms up to and eventually embraces his fated role in the Bajoran faith.

When Sisko leads the Defiant into the wormhole to intercept a Dominion fleet, the Prophets intervene. Sisko, at this point, has not fulfilled his destiny; to ensure that he survives, the Prophets erase the Dominion forces from existence.

Sisko plays a critical role in the intrigue of the Alpha Quadrant. His actions prove key in the security of Earth and the whole Alpha Quadrant. Examples include when he meets his former Captain, Admiral Leyton and learns that he planned on overthrowing the Federation government. Leyton framed Sisko as a shapeshifter who infiltrated Starfleet by faking a blood test. Sisko subsequently escaped custody with the help of Odo and stopped Leyton's plans. During the Klingon invasion of Cardassia, he is crucial to exposing the shapeshifter impersonating Klingon general Martok. Sisko's exploits continue during the Dominion's invasion of the Alpha Quadrant, eventually working alongside Vice Admiral William Ross to help plan massive actions against the Dominion and their Cardassian and Breen allies. Sisko's contributions to the war effort are sometimes more surreptitious, such as his clandestine work with former Obsidian Order operative Elim Garak. Specifically, Garak and Sisko work to bring the Romulans into the war by creating an elaborate ruse. He and Garak, with the help of a petty criminal, create a sophisticated holoprogram, specifically the recording of a high-level Dominion meeting planning the invasion of Romulus. They were to then give the fabricated evidence to Senator Vreenak, a Romulan Senator visiting the station who had staunch pro-Dominion leanings. As the ruse progressed however, due to several unforeseen complications that arose along the way, Sisko was grudgingly forced to set aside his an increasing amount of his moral certainty to make the plan a success and save the Federation, such as bribing Quark, and becoming an accessory to murder twice over. Vreenak discovered the forgery quickly enough, and angrily departed the station, determined to expose Sisko's plan to the entire Quadrant. En route back to Romulus, however, he was assassinated by a bomb Garak had clandestinely planted in his shuttle. Ironically, it wasn't the holoprogram itself, but Vreenak's assassination that brought the Romulans into the war, since the Tal Shiar (the Romulan equivalent of the Obsidian Order) believed the senator was assassinated by the Dominion after he found evidence of their planned invasion, and not by Garak, after discovering the data rod containing the holoprogram of the invasion plans that the Tal Shair assumed he was bring back to Romulus to warn his government, and any errors or flaws in the data stored within the rod was due to from damage from the explosion and not because it was a sophisticated forgery. Sisko was enraged when he figured out that Garak was behind the assassination, but later admitted with a note of bitterness that Garak was right, in that two deaths and an uneasy conscience was a very small price to pay in order to save the entire Alpha Quadrant.

Sisko fulfills the Prophets' destiny for him in the series finale, "What You Leave Behind", by confronting the Kosst Amojan-possessed Gul Dukat. They fight, and Dukat seems to be the winner, but in a last effort, Sisko throws himself and Dukat into the fiery abyss of the Bajoran Fire Caves, and Sisko is pulled into the Prophets' plane of existence to live with and learn from them. Sisko imparts a farewell to his new—and pregnant— wife, Kasidy Yates, informing her that although he does not know when, he will eventually return to her.

Personal life
Sisko was first married to Jennifer Sisko, with whom he had a son, Jake.

As seen in the pilot episode "Emissary", Sisko harbored a deep resentment towards Captain Jean-Luc Picard for years because it was Picard, as Locutus of Borg, who led the Borg attack against the Federation at the Battle of Wolf 359. Sisko lost his wife, Jennifer, during the Borg attack, forcing Sisko to raise their young son, Jake, as a single parent. To take care of Jake, Sisko placed his Starfleet career on hold by taking up a backwater position at the Federation Utopia Planitia shipyard orbiting Mars.

Sisko remained a widower and single parent for many years. Eventually Sisko reluctantly accepted a posting as commander of Deep Space Nine orbiting the planet Bajor, where he eventually married a space freighter captain, Kasidy Yates.

Sisko loves baseball, a sport that has largely disappeared by the 24th century but is kept alive by a small group of aficionados. He keeps a baseball on the desk in his office (given to him by an alien impersonating Buck Bokai, Sisko's favorite historical baseball player, halfway through the first season), and often picks it up and tosses it around when deep in thought. When the Dominion captures DS9, Sisko leaves the ball in his office as a message that he intends to return (this can also be seen in the second season three-parter, consisting of "Homecoming", "The Circle" and "The Siege" and also the Season 5 finale, "Call To Arms"). After Jadzia Dax's death in the Season 6 finale, "Tears of the Prophets", he takes the baseball with him to Earth, causing Kira Nerys to worry that he will not return.

Like his father, a chef, Sisko also enjoys cooking. His father owns a restaurant in New Orleans, and specialized in Creole cuisine.

It is also widely known that Sisko wants to become an Admiral; he states this intent to Admiral Ross during his temporary assignment at a starbase under Ross' command.

Alter egos
Sisko can also be identified as two other characters in the Star Trek universe:

Benny Russell
In the episode "Far Beyond the Stars", Sisko considers resigning his commission after losing an old friend during the Dominion War and the Prophets intervene, making Sisko briefly live the life of Benny Russell, a science fiction short story writer in 1950s America. (The other people in Russell's life are played by Brooks' DS9 co-stars, allowing them to appear without the heavy prosthetic makeup of their alien characters and show viewers their true appearance.)

Every day, Russell faces the prejudices of his world; his publisher does not even allow his photograph to be printed. He writes a story called "Deep Space Nine" that takes place in a universe without prejudice and bigotry. However, his publisher refuses to release the story because he makes the commander of the space station a black man. This injustice eventually drives Benny insane; soon after, Sisko finds himself back in the 24th century, understanding his place is aboard the station but questioning the nature of reality.

Later, in "Shadows and Symbols", Sisko experiences more flashbacks to his "life" as Benny Russell, now in a mental institution, obsessively writing the episode, synchronously, on the wall. Although it seems to be left ambiguous as to whether Benny is real or the Prophets' creation, at the end of this episode, the wormhole alien he was hunting says, "The Kosst Amojan tried to stop you with a false vision", implying that the Pah-wraiths were implanting the Russell fantasy into Sisko's mind to throw him off his mission.

Gabriel Bell
Due to a time travel incident depicted in "Past Tense" (S3E11 & E12), Sisko is transported to early-21st-century Earth where his presence unintentionally causes the death of Gabriel Bell, an important figure in early-21st-century America. Sisko takes Bell's place to preserve the timeline. Sisko (as "Bell") instigates the Bell Riots, which helped change the course of human history.

Although Sisko is successful in fulfilling Bell's destiny and preserving the timeline, historical images of Bell after this point show Sisko's image.

Cultural references
 In Sunshine by Robin McKinley, the title character mentions a tour company called "Earth Trek" operated by a man named Benjamin Sisko.

Reception
In 2009, IGN ranked Sisko as the 8th best character of Star Trek overall. In 2012, Paste Magazine rated Sisko as the #9 character of all Star Trek live-action television shows up to that time. In 2016, ScreenRant rated Benjamin Sisko as the fourth best character in Star Trek overall as presented in television and film up to that time.  In 2016, Sisko was ranked as the 2nd most important character of Starfleet within the Star Trek science fiction universe by Wired magazine.

In 2017, The Washington Post ranked Sisko as the second best Captain of Star Trek, and compared him to the American WW2 General and US President Eisenhower. They note how he tried to raise his son on the wayward space station despite being widowed, while contending with crew of dubious loyalties. In 2017, Space.com ranked Sisko the fifth best captain of Star Trek. In 2017, Screen Rant ranked Sisko the 3rd most attractive person in the Star Trek universe, in between Seven of Nine and Nyota Uhura.

In 2019, Cinema Blend ranked Sisko the fourth best Star Trek Starfleet character of all time. Sisko was rated as one of the top seven time travelers of the Star Trek franchise by Nerdist in 2019, especially for his time traveling adventures in "Trials and Tribble-ations" and "Past Tense".

In 2018, CBR ranked Sisko the third best Starfleet character of Star Trek, in between Janeway and Picard.

References

Sources

External links

 Emissary of the Prophets article at Memory Alpha
 Benjamin Sisko at StarTrek.com

Black people in television
Fictional African-American people
Fictional characters from New Orleans
Television characters introduced in 1993
Fictional baseball players
Fictional characters with alter egos
Fictional chefs
Fictional commanders
Fictional prophets
Fictional war criminals
Orphan characters in television
Star Trek: Deep Space Nine characters
Starfleet captains
Starfleet commanders
Starfleet officers
Fictional people from the 24th-century
Male characters in television